The Košice–Bohumín Railway can refer to:
originally: A private railway company established in 1869 in Austria-Hungary. In 1924 the company was nationalised and put under the Czechoslovak State Railways.
nowadays: The main track of this company (between Košice and Bohumín). The Košice-Bohumín track connected the industrial area of Silesia with the city of Košice in what is now eastern Slovakia. It was completed in 1872.

Tracks of the company
 Košice – Bohumín (350 km, construction started in 1869, completed in 1869–1872), including:
 Bohumín – Český Těšín completed on 5 May 1869
 Český Těšín – Žilina completed on 8 January 1871
 Žilina – Poprad completed on 8 December 1871
 Poprad – Spišská Nová Ves completed on 12 December 1871
 Spišská Nová Ves – Kysak completed on 12 March 1872
 (Košice) – Kysak – Prešov (completed on 1 September 1870)
 Štrbské Pleso–Štrba rack railway (gauge 1000 mm, completed in 1896)
 Tatra Electric Railway (gauge 1000 mm, completed in 1912)

External links
 History of the Slovak railways
 Košice-Bohumín Railway on the ŽSR page 

Railway lines in Slovakia
Railway companies of Czechoslovakia
Habsburg Silesia
Cieszyn Silesia
Railway lines in the Czech Republic
Railway lines opened in 1872
Defunct railway companies of Hungary
Defunct railway companies of Austria